The Bergenstest, also known as Test i norsk - høyere nivå, was a test for proficiency in the Norwegian language, with variants available for both bokmål and nynorsk. It was discontinued in October 2022 and replaced by the Norwegian test. The test was nationally approved and was a pre-requisite for non-native speakers who wish to study at a tertiary education institute (college or universities) in Norway. Citizens who have Swedish or Danish as their native language were not required to undertake this test as proof of Norwegian language competence. It was a pass/fail test with written and oral sections which were intended to be passed by someone with an advanced grasp of the language, equivalent to a B2/C1 reference level under the Common European Framework of Reference for Languages. The test could be taken several times a year at various educational institutes around the country, and also twice a year abroad in April and October.
Those who passed the test can apply to study at a Norwegian university or college for courses taught in Norwegian. It is furthermore the highest language test available for the language.

References 

Norwegian language tests